"One Time" is a song by American hip hop group Migos. It premiered on February 5, 2015, and was released for digital download on February 10, 2015 by Quality Control Music, 300 Entertainment and Atlantic Records. The song was produced by Deko.

Composition
The song features a "wavy" and "simple, bass heavy" beat, as well as ad-libs throughout the song. In the hook, Quavo lists off things that only take one time for Migos to influence pop culture or accomplish.

Music video
A music video for the song, directed by Ninian Doff, was released on March 23, 2015. It finds Migos waking up and recovering from a wild party, with flashbacks of the party shown. The video features cameos from actor Blake Anderson and football player DeSean Jackson.

Charts

References

External links
 

2015 singles
2015 songs
Migos songs
300 Entertainment singles
Songs written by Quavo
Songs written by Offset (rapper)
Songs written by Takeoff (rapper)
Music videos directed by Ninian Doff
Atlantic Records singles